D'Mitrik Trice (born May 2, 1996) is an American professional basketball player for ZTE KK of the Nemzeti Bajnokság I/A, the top division in Hungary. He played college basketball for the Wisconsin Badgers.

High school career
Trice played basketball for Wayne High School in Huber Heights, Ohio under his father's coaching. As a senior, he averaged 10.3 points and 5.7 assists per game, leading his team to the Division I state title. Trice left as the school's all-time leader in assists. He was also the starting quarterback on Wayne's football team for two years, reaching the state championship game in his senior season. Trice played a postgraduate season of basketball at IMG Academy in Bradenton, Florida, averaging 12.3 points, 4.1 assists and four rebounds per game. He committed to play college basketball for Wisconsin over Ohio State and Vanderbilt.

College career

As a freshman at Wisconsin, Trice averaged 5.6 points and 1.7 assists in 18.3 minutes per game. He appeared in all 37 games and made two starts while Bronson Koenig was injured. Trice was averaging 9.4 points per game as a sophomore, but suffered a season-ending foot injury and was granted a medical redshirt after being limited to 10 games. On November 22, 2018, Trice scored a season-high 25 points, shooting 7-of-8 from three-point range, in a 78–58 win over Oklahoma at the Battle 4 Atlantis semifinals. In his redshirt sophomore season, he was Wisconsin's starting point guard in all 34 games, averaging 11.6 points and 2.8 assists per game, and was an All-Big Ten Honorable Mention pick. 

On December 21, 2019, Trice scored a career-high 31 points in an 83–64 victory over Milwaukee. After Kobe King left the team following a loss to Purdue on January 24, 2020, Trice's production increased, and he posted 12 points, 5.8 rebounds and 6.3 assists per game during the next four games. He recorded 28 points and four assists in an 81–74 win over Michigan on February 27. As a junior, Trice averaged 9.8 points, four rebounds and 4.2 assists per game. He was named to the Third Team All-Big Ten by the league's coaches and was an All-Big Ten Honorable Mention selection by the media. As a senior, Trice averaged 13.9 points and 4 assists per game, leading the Badgers to an 18–13 record and the Round of 32 of the NCAA Tournament.

Professional career
On September 15, 2021, Trice signed with Fos Provence Basket of the LNB Pro A. In five games, he averaged 5.2 points, 1.4 assists, and 1.0 rebound per game.

On February 8, 2022, he has signed with Śląsk Wrocław of the Polish Basketball League, joining his older brother Travis.

Career statistics

College

|-
| style="text-align:left;"| 2016–17
| style="text-align:left;"| Wisconsin
| 37 || 2 || 18.2 || .380 || .418 || .789 || 1.9 || 1.7 || .5 || .1 || 5.6
|-
| style="text-align:left;"| 2017–18
| style="text-align:left;"| Wisconsin
| 10 || 10 || 31.5 || .380 || .300 || .706 || 2.0 || 2.3 || .6 || .1 || 9.4
|-
| style="text-align:left;"| 2018–19
| style="text-align:left;"| Wisconsin
| 34 || 34 || 32.5 || .384 || .390 || .750 || 2.8 || 2.6 || .9 || .0 || 11.6
|-
| style="text-align:left;"| 2019–20
| style="text-align:left;"| Wisconsin
| 31 || 31 || 32.2 || .380 || .376 || .745 || 4.0 || 4.2 || .8 || .1 || 9.8
|-
| style="text-align:left;"| 2020–21
| style="text-align:left;"| Wisconsin
| 31 || 31 || 33.3 || .410 || .373 || .792 || 3.4 || 4.0 || .8 || .0 || 13.9
|- class="sortbottom"
| style="text-align:center;" colspan="2"| Career 
| 143 || 108 || 28.8 || .390 || .381 || .767 || 2.9 || 3.0 || .7 || .1 || 10.0

Personal life
Trice's older brother, Travis, played college basketball for Michigan State and now plays professionally. His father, Travis Sr., played the same sport for Purdue and Butler. His father's cousin is WNBA player Jackie Young. Trice's grandfather, Bob Pritchett, was an All-American basketball player for Old Dominion in the 1960s and is a member of the school's Sports Hall of Fame.

References

External links
Wisconsin Badgers bio

1996 births
Living people
American men's basketball players
American expatriate basketball people in France
Basketball players from Ohio
Fos Provence Basket players
IMG Academy alumni
People from Huber Heights, Ohio
Point guards
Śląsk Wrocław basketball players
Wisconsin Badgers men's basketball players